Han Yi may refer to:
 Yi Lijun, Chinese translator who uses the pen name Han Yi
 Han Yi (footballer), Chinese footballer